Cambio de Piel (English title:Change of skin) is a Venezuelan telenovela produced by Radio Caracas Televisión in 1998 based on the telenovela La dama de rosa written by José Ignacio Cabrujas in 1986. This version was created by Perla Farías and lasted for 110 episodes.

Synopsis
Daniella Martínez and José Ignacio Quintana lead radically different lives. He is financially solid, competent and married. His marriage is stable with no alarming events in spite of his infidelities. Unfortunately, his wife has not been able to bear children. Daniella is a young, impetuous woman, who is very astute, determined and joyful and whose lifelong dream is to become an actress. In her search for stardom, she meets José Ignacio Quintana, and a strong attraction grows between them immediately. They have no idea that this encounter will result in an unlimited, passionate relationship which will be marked by resentment. They are brought together by love and separated by pain.

Daniella, a victim of injustice, is arrested and sentenced for a crime she did not commit. José Ignacio, feeling betrayed, falls into confusing events, and, in Daniella's eyes, he becomes the main person to blame for her tragedy. Years later, José Ignacio tries to erase this woman from his mind and heart, the woman he says he hates. Great passion will evolve around this relationship, which will create unexpected and revealing situations for them, as well as for the characters surrounding them.

Cast
Coraima Torres as Daniella Martínez / Victoria Guerrero
Eduardo Serrano as José Ignacio Quintana
Caridad Canelón as Leyla Daud 
América Alonso as Amalia Martínez 
Ricardo Bianchi as Luis Enrique Arismendi
Héctor Mayerston as Augusto Quintana
Pedro Durán as Ángel Buenaventura
Beatriz Valdés as Yolanda Urbieta
Catherine Correia as Ana Virginia Arismendi
Alberto Alifa as Elías Durán
Larisa Asuaje as Silvia
María Luisa Lamata as Petra
José Gabriel Gonsalves as Marcos Martínez
María Cristina Lozada as Soledad Martínez Vda. de Quintana
Indira Leal as Carla Ruggeiro 
Manuel Salazar as Néstor Molina
Vilem Stalek as Diego
Jessica Braun as Tulia Martínez

References

External links
Cambio de Piel at the Internet Movie Database
Opening Credits

1997 telenovelas
RCTV telenovelas
Venezuelan telenovelas
1997 Venezuelan television series debuts
1998 Venezuelan television series endings
Spanish-language telenovelas
Television shows set in Caracas